Katarina Kuini Whare-rau-aruhe Te Tau  (née Ellison; 29 December 1899 – 8 March 1998) was a notable New Zealand tribal leader, welfare worker and community leader. Of Māori descent, she identified with the Ngāi Tahu iwi. She was born in Puketeraki, near Karitane, Otago, New Zealand, in 1899.

In the 1975 New Year Honours, Te Tau was awarded the British Empire Medal, for services to the community. She received the New Zealand Suffrage Centennial Medal in 1993.

References

1899 births
1998 deaths
Ngāi Tahu people
People from Otago
New Zealand recipients of the British Empire Medal
Recipients of the New Zealand Suffrage Centennial Medal 1993